The Anguilla necropolis is an archaeological site in the Italian comune of Ribera in the province of Agrigento in Sicily.

Description 
The necropolis dates from the middle and late Bronze Age (13th century BC) and was discovered in 1982. It is located to the south of the town of Ribera.

It consists of two types of tombs: artificial caves and chambers. Some are accessed through a 1.5-5 metre long corridore called a "dromos", located in front of the tomb itself. The tombs consist of one or two chambers with a corbel vaulted dome (tholos) containing a platform with the corpse and votive offerings (vases, rings, arms, tools) on it.

The dimensions and typology of these tombs are unique in western Sicily.

References

Bibliography 
 
 

Buildings and structures completed in the 13th century BC
1982 archaeological discoveries
Archaeological sites in the province of Agrigento
Bronze Age sites in Europe
Necropoleis